Hendrik de Kok (20 March 1902 – 24 May 1993) was a South African rower. He competed in the men's single sculls event at the 1928 Summer Olympics.

References

External links
 

1902 births
1993 deaths
People from Masilonyana Local Municipality
South African male rowers
Olympic rowers of South Africa
Rowers at the 1928 Summer Olympics
20th-century South African people